Home and Away is an Australian soap opera first broadcast on the Seven Network on 17 January 1988. The following is a list of characters that first appeared in 1995, by order of first appearance. They were all introduced by the show's then executive producer John Holmes. The 8th season of Home and Away began airing on 16 January 1995. The first introduction of the year was Daniel Goddard as drug dealer Eric Phillips. Adrian Lee began portraying teacher Andrew Warren in March. Nic Testoni joined the serial in April as Travis Nash. Kristy Wright took on the role of Chloe Richards in June. Kimberley Joseph began playing Joanne Brennan from July. Katrina Hobbs began playing doctor Kelly Watson in August. Nick Freedman debuted as Alex Bennett in October, while Quinn Jackson also made her first appearance. The following month, David Ritchie arrived as Alex's father, Saul.

Eric Phillips

Eric Phillips, played by Daniel Goddard. Goddard signed to guest star in the show for six weeks. Eric is characterised as being calculating and has muscles. Goddard told Victoria Ross from Inside Soap that "Eric can be manipulative and he knows how to get people on side". Jack Wilson (Daniel Amalm) and Curtis Reed (Shane Ammann) befriend Eric and ask him for help getting into shape, he reveals that he uses steroids. Goddard explained that Eric agrees to help the duo "but things turn sour when Eric suggests that Jack try steroids to build up his muscles even more." The actor revealed that Eric only leaves Summer Bay after causing a lot of trouble. Goddard's stint on Home and Away proved popular with viewers and he received much fan mail. He added that there was a possibility of Eric returning once again. Ross said that Eric was a "bad boy" character with better biceps than Shane Parrish (Dieter Brummer). She added that Eric's arrival had the Summer Bay females "hearts fluttering" and the males "reaching for their dumbbells." A writer from the Home and Away Official Collector's Edition said that "through 1995, Goddard caused a storm of trouble in Home and Away as bad boy Eric Phillips".

Eric arrives in town and makes friends with Jack and Curtis. They are impressed with his physique and asks for tips. He tells them he uses steroids. Curtis is reluctant but Jack is determined, even more so after Curtis bests him in an arm-wrestling contest. Shannon Reed (Isla Fisher) takes an interest in Eric and they begin dating. Shannon's friends and family warn her about Eric but she refuses to listen. Eric gets violent with Shannon and Jack intervenes. Eric then leaves Summer Bay.

Andrew Warren
	 
Andrew Warren, played by Adrian Lee, made his first appearance on 16 March 1995 and departed on 3 May 1995. Andrew was introduced into serial as the former lover of established character Donna Bishop (Nicola Quilter) who arrives in order to reconcile with her. Lee told Victoria Ross from Inside Soap that Donna is "in big trouble" when she gets back together with Andrew again. He explained that "there are a lot of men like Andrew who seem like nice guys on the surface but there is something that just makes them flip." In his case jealousy is the trigger of his violence, each time "he sees Donna with another man he just lashes out". After Andrew witnesses Donna with Rob Storey (Matthew Lilley) and Travis Nash (Nic Testoni) he hits Donna and bruises her eye. Lee researched the issue by looking at associated text and female victims of domestic violence. He felt "edgy" about playing issue led storylines, but he was more inclined to portray because the story behind the abuse was an important subject. However, Lee claimed that as an actor he would attempt to find excuses for Andrew's behaviour. Lee wanted to return to the serial for another stint. He concluded that "it's so much fun getting to act out a horrible character; I just loved being a baddie."

Andrew arrives and immediately gets Shane Parrish (Dieter Brummer) offside by parking in a handicapped spot as his fiancée Angel Brooks (Melissa George) is in a wheelchair. Andrew takes the position of Maths teacher for Year 11 and Donna is horrified to find him at the same school as her. She tells him she never wants to see him again. Rob Storey, Donna's friend who also teaches at the school warns Andrew away. He is made to feel less than welcome in town when several people learn of his violent past with Donna. Andrew becomes Jack Wilson's (Daniel Amalm) tutor, but Michael Ross (Dennis Coard) is reluctant to let him continue with the tutoring. Eventually he gives in. After a while people begin to see Andrew is genuinely trying to change and their opinion changes when he helps Irene Roberts (Lynne McGranger) after she collapses from stress and is able to raise Sally Fletcher's (Kate Ritchie) grades in order for her to take Maths classes at Year 11 level. In spite of this, Donna refuses to believe it and slaps him only to feel that she is no better than him. Donna apologise to Andrew and realises he is trying to change and forgives him and he promises never to hit her again.

Andrew and Donna reconcile much to Rob's horror. Rob tries to get Donna to see the sense and lashes out at Andrew, but this only elevates Andrew in Donna's estimation and she is hostile towards Rob and tells him to stay away. Rob apologises grudingly and accepts the relationship. Andrew asks Donna to move in with him and she agrees. Travis Nash returns to town and Donna and Rob spend a lot of time together reminiscing about the day they all met ten years earlier. After witnessing, Donna having fun with her friends, Andrew becomes jealous and when he sees Donna give Rob a kiss for helping her move some furniture in Andrew's flat, he hits her, and ends up trashing the flat after Donna leaves him. Donna moves out and when she comes for the rest of her things, Andrew tries to stop her leaving and almost hits her again, but is interrupted by Rob who arrives in his car and rescues Donna by punching Andrew. The police arrive and arrest Andrew issuing him a summons and a restraining order and he resigns from the school and leaves the bay.

The episode featuring the climax of Donna's domestic abuse at the hands of Andrew was
nominated for "Best Episode in a Television Drama Serial" at the Australian Film Institute Awards in 1995.

Travis Nash

Travis Nash, played by Nic Testoni, made his first on screen appearance on 10 April 1995 and departed on 11 August 1999. For his portrayal of Travis, Testoni won the "Most Popular New Talent" Logie Award in 1996. A year later, Testoni was nominated for "Most Popular Actor". In 1998, Travis and Rebecca were named "Best Couple" at the Inside Soap Awards. They received a nomination in the same category the following year. Judy Johnson of The Sun-Herald branded Travis a "dreamboat fisherman."

Chloe Richards

Chloe Richards, played by Kristy Wright. She debuted on-screen during the episode airing on 28 June 1995. 
Wright was asked to join the regular cast of Home and Away as Chloe, after initially appearing as a background extra in the series. The episode involving Chloe's confrontation with her rapist Brad Cooper received the Australian Writers' Guild award for "Best Episode in a Television Serial" in 1997 and was presented to the episode's writer Greg Haddrick. For her portrayal of Chloe, Wright was nominated for Best actress at the 1998 Logie Awards and was nominated the following year for "Sexiest Female" at The Inside Soap Awards.

Kelly Watson

Kelly Watson, played by Katrina Hobbs made her first appearance on 28 August 1995. Hobbs joined Home and Away in August 1995. To prepare for the role she followed doctors around Sydney's St. Vincent hospital and took notes. In an interview with Daniel Dasey from The Sydney Morning Herald, Hobbs told of how her fellow cast members labelled her "Doctor Death", following the death of Shane Parrish (Dieter Brummer). She quit the serial in 1997.

Joanne Brennan

Joanne Brennan, portrayed by Kimberley Joseph. Joseph originally auditioned for the part of Donna Bishop, but lost out to Nicola Quilter. Joanne was introduced as old school acquaintance of Angel Parrish (Melissa George) who comes back to make her life a misery. Joseph, who previously appeared in axed Channel 9 soap opera told Rachel Browne of the Sun-Herald: "It's a good change of pace for me because my character in Paradise Beach was so saccharin-sweet", she said.

Joanne is a former schoolmate of Angel Parrish. They meet when Angel applies for a modelling job with Raoul Irving (Lloyd Morris). Joanne is rude and bitchy towards Angel when she turns down an offer to share the prize money of $10,000. Joanne takes a position at Summer Bay High as a secretary and secretly begins dealing drugs to students. Chloe Richards (Kristy Wright) is one of her customers. Joanne seduces Steven Matheson (Adam Willits) away from nurse Lindsay Simons (Kate Agnew). When a small bag of speed is found at the school, Joanne accuses Chloe of informing on her. In order to divert attention from the drug matter, Joanne accuses her employer, principal Donald Fisher (Norman Coburn) of sexual harassment. Chloe's conscience gets the better of her and Donald is cleared and Joanne is arrested for dealing.

She is paroled several months later and schemes to con Simon Broadhurst (Julian Garner) out of his money by feigning an interest in him. Angel, who is now interested in Simon after previously rejecting him, is upset by this. Joanne and Simon prepare to leave the bay but Simon promptly dumps her on the roadside and chooses Angel after learning of Joanne's lying and scheming. Joanne is then picked up by another rich man in a limousine and leaves the bay.

Alex Bennett

Alex Bennett, portrayed by Nick Freedman, made his first appearance on 16 October 1995 and departed on 16 August 1996. Home and Away producers were scouting for an "easygoing hippy type" actor. They were familiar with Freedman's work in the shows Echo Point and GP and offered him the role of Alex. Prior to landing the role of Alex, Freedman was also a musician. Alex was introduced as a love interest for established character Shannon Reed (Isla Fisher). An Inside Soap columnist described Alex as a "laid-back, have-a-go hero". Alex is a popular Summer Bay resident who is liked by all. He is a struggling artist who looks run down, but he has a "romantic heart". He first meets Shannon when he rescues her from a group of men and soon begins a relationship with her. Shannon needed someone in her life and they appeared to be a good match. But their relationship soon becomes problematic. Freedman soon decided to leave the series and it was announced in July 1996 that he had already filmed his final scenes. Following his departure, Freedman criticised Fisher as a "silly little redhead". Freedman left to concentrate on his musical career as the frontman of his own band, Lurch. He told Kendall hill of The Age "I'm up against silly prejudices that say you can only be recognised creatively in one field – which is usually just a manufactured image anyway. But Lurch's music is bigger than nonsense like that."

Quinn Jackson

Quinn Jackson made her first appearance on 26 October 1995. She was originally played by Danielle Spencer. The character was introduced as the daughter of Alf Stewart (Ray Meagher). Meagher explained that in Alf's fictional backstory he met Quinn's mother, an American nurse stationed in Singapore, during the Vietnam War, they had a fling and she returned to the United States without telling him she was pregnant. Meagher said that Alf wants to help Quinn when he learns who she is, but she "hates him on sight" when she catches him being grumpy with one of the Summer Bay residents. He also described Quinn as "very manipulative" and said she creates problems between him and his wife. Meagher praised Spencer's professionalism, saying "she has so much energy that you literally work off her. I felt as thought I was being carried along for the ride." In October 2017, it was announced that the character would be returning to the show, after a 22-year absence. Actress Lara Cox was cast in the role. Ahead of Quinn's return, her son Ryder Jackson (Lukas Radovich) was introduced. Quinn returned on 23 November.

Quinn arrives in Summer Bay to see Alf Stewart. She finds him at his store, but does not disclose her identity upon meeting him when she witnesses an argument between him and Shannon Reed (Isla Fisher). Quinn rents a caravan from Michael (Dennis Coard) and Pippa Ross (Debra Lawrence). Alf is immediately suspicious of her and thinks she is a reporter trying to dig up dirt on the proposed caravan park development. He confronts Quinn, who denies being a reporter in a heated argument. Quinn decides to leave, but Alf tracks her down at the bus stop and she reveals she is his daughter. Alf then recounts meeting Quinn's mother Mary during the Vietnam War, when she was stationed in Australia, and they had a relationship, but Mary left town without telling Alf she was pregnant.

Alf then introduces Quinn to his wife Ailsa (Judy Nunn) and son Duncan (Lewis Devaney). Ailsa and Quinn clash a lot due to Ailsa's suspicions of Quinn's true motives, as Alf barely knows her. Steven Matheson (Adam Willits) takes an interest in Quinn and they begin a short relationship. Quinn tells Steven her true motive is to get revenge on Alf for abandoning her mother as soon as he found out she was pregnant, leaving her to be raised by Mary and her stepfather, Frank, who admittedly did not care for her. After seeing Quinn stir things up between Alf, Ailsa and the Rosses over the development, Steven decides to end the relationship with her.

Alf explains to Quinn that he regrets not being there for her while she was growing up and offers her a share of the development's profits, which she rejects. Alf reveals that Mary's commanding officer sent her back to the United States when knowledge of their relationship arose. Quinn is shocked when she realises Alf is telling the truth, and that Frank had lied to her. This makes her feel guilty as she had leaked a report that proves the development will have a negative effect on the town. Quinn admits she wanted to make Alf pay and is sorry, but he refuses to hear it and she decides to leave. However, after talking with Ailsa, Alf decides to give Quinn a second chance, but arrives at the wharf just in time to see her seaplane take off.

In 2017, Quinn gets in contact with Alf after seeing that her son Ryder is in Summer Bay. She asks him to send Ryder back to the camp he has run away from. Quinn turns up at Summer Bay House two weeks early and Ryder introduces her to her half-sister Roo Stewart (Georgie Parker). Alf arrives home and they decide to go to the Pier Diner to talk. Quinn reveals that she is living in Brisbane and is a singer on a cruise ship. Roo notices that Quinn constantly puts Ryder down and suggests that she should be more supportive. Quinn takes offence and tells Ryder they are leaving, but Alf persuades her to stay in the Bay for a while.

Saul Bennett

Saul Bennett, played by former Macquarie University Senior Lecturer, Dr. David Ritchie, first on screen appearance on 21 November 1995. Saul is a leader of a religious cult and attempts to lure Selina Roberts (Tempany Deckert) into joining the cause. Tina Baker of Soaplife said " Home and Away's cult leader Saul was nice Joey Rainbow's dad, but that didn't stop him from brainwashing his devotees, stealing Irene's baby, kidnapping Selina on her wedding day, and trying to force her to have his child...as you do." A columnist from Inside Soap described Saul as "nuttier than a veggie roast" and cults and fires "go hand-in-hand" in soap operas. They added that Saul looked just like Gandalf from The Lord of the Rings.

Others

References

External links
Characters and cast at the Official AU Home and Away website
Characters and cast at the Official UK Home and Away website
Characters and cast at the Internet Movie Database

, 1995
, Home and Away